"#9 Dream" is a song written by John Lennon and first issued on his 1974 album Walls and Bridges. It was released as the second single from that album months later, on Apple Records catalogue Apple 1878 in the United States and Apple R6003 in the United Kingdom. It peaked at number9 on the Billboard Hot100, and it hit number23 on the British singles chart. A video for the song was made in 2003.

Background
"#9 Dream" came to Lennon in a dream.  Lennon has said that the song was just "churned out" with "no inspiration".

According to May Pang's website, two working titles for the song were "So Long Ago" and "Walls & Bridges". Pang also states that the phrase repeated in the chorus, "Ah! böwakawa poussé, poussé", came to Lennon in a dream and has no specific meaning. Pang added that Al Coury of Capitol Records initially protested against the use of the word "pussy" in the chorus, but after Lori Burton, the wife of studio engineer Roy Cicala, suggested that it should be sung as "poussé", as if in a foreign language, the lyrics were kept.

The song was notable as a favourite of Lennon's, despite his later claim that the song was a "throwaway". Pang said on the matter, "This was one of John's favorite songs, because it literally came to him in a dream. He woke up and wrote down those words along with the melody. He had no idea what it meant, but he thought it sounded beautiful."

Content
Lennon liked the string arrangement he wrote for Harry Nilsson's rendition of "Many Rivers to Cross", originally by Jimmy Cliff, from the album Pussy Cats so much that he decided to incorporate it into the song.

The backing vocal is provided by May Pang, Lennon's partner at the time. Lennon wrote and arranged the song around his dream, hence the title and atmospheric, dreamlike feel, including the use of cellos in the chorus. The song's intricate production is reminiscent of "Strawberry Fields Forever".

Recording
The song was tracked at the Record Plant in New York City on 23July 1974, under the working title "Walls and Bridges". Pang added her dreamy "John" overdub on 26August 1974.

Reception
It peaked at number9 on the Billboard Hot100, also peaking at number 10 on the Cashbox Top100 in the US. It charted at number23 on the UK Singles Chart and number35 in Canada.

Billboard commented on the contrast with Lennon's previous single from Walls and Bridges, "Whatever Gets You Through the Night", stating that "#9 Dream" is a "soft rocker" with "strong production" values which it expected would reach the Top5.  Cash Box said that it 
"is milder and more gentle than ['Whatever Gets You Through the Night'] with fine and subdued instrumentation acting as mellow cushion to John's vocal" and said that "the lyrics are super."  Record World said that Lennon's "best romantic ode since 'Imagine' exits with a chant reminiscent of ex-Beatle Harrison's 'My Sweet Lord.'"

Personnel
The musicians who performed on the original recording were as follows:
John Lennon – vocals, acoustic guitar
The 44th Street Fairies: Lennon, May Pang, Lori Burton, Joey Dambra – backing vocals
Ken Ascher – clavinet
Jesse Ed Davis – guitar
Nicky Hopkins – electric piano
Arthur Jenkins – percussion
Jim Keltner – drums
Bobby Keys – saxophone
Eddie Mottau – acoustic guitar
Klaus Voormann – bass guitar

Chart performance

Weekly charts

Year-end charts

Legacy
R.E.M. covered the song and released it as a single from the 2007 benefit album Instant Karma: The Amnesty International Campaign to Save Darfur. The cover featured founding drummer Bill Berry, his only recording with R.E.M. between his 1997 retirement and the band's 2011 disbandment. 
The international version of the Instant Karma! album features a second cover of the song, by a-ha.
British novelist David Mitchell titled his second novel number9dream in homage to Lennon.
Andrea Corr covered this song on her 2011 album, Lifelines.
Bill Frisell included "Number 9 Dream" on his 2011 Lennon-McCartney tribute album, All We Are Saying.
José González covered this song on the 2013 movie soundtrack for The Secret Life of Walter Mitty.

References

External links
 Lyrics of this song
 

1974 singles
1975 singles
2007 singles
Songs about dreams
John Lennon songs
R.E.M. songs
A-ha songs
Apple Records singles
Warner Records singles
Songs written by John Lennon
Song recordings produced by Jacknife Lee
Song recordings produced by John Lennon
1974 songs
British soft rock songs
Plastic Ono Band songs